The Aston Martin DB3S is a sports racing car that was built by Aston Martin. Following the failure of the heavy and uncompetitive Aston Martin DB3 designed by Eberan Eberhorst; William Watson, employed as Eberhorst's assistant, presented an alternative design to John Wyer, Aston Martin's competitions manager, whose assistance was needed as Eberhorst could well oppose being up-staged. In total 31 cars were made, with 11 works cars and 20 cars being sold for customer use.

The DB3S was introduced in 1953 and it proved significantly more successful than the Aston Martin DB3. Although the DB3S failed at Le Mans they went on to score a 1–2 at the Tourist Trophy at Dundrod in the 6th round of the inaugural World Sports Car Championship to help Astons to 3rd in the championship. As well there was a win in the non championship Goodwood 9 Hours.

1954 was a less successful season with a third place in the Buenos Aires 1000 km being the high point. However the cars failed at the Sebring 12 hours, the Mille Miglia, Le Mans and the Tourist Trophy. 1955 saw a return to form. Astons missed the opening two rounds at Buenos Aires and Sebring and the sole DB3S failed to finish at the Mille Miglia but Collins/Frere finished 2nd at Le Mans and Walker/Poore scored a 4th at the Tourist Trophy behind the dominant 1, 2, 3 of the Mercedes 300SLR to finish 5th in the championship. There was also time for another win in the non championship Goodwood 9 Hours.

By 1956 the design was starting to show its age and Astons were putting their resources into the development of the new DBR1 but the DB3S still finished 4th at Sebring and 5th at the Nurburging 1000 km to finish 4th in the championship together with another second at Le Mans in the hands of Moss/Collins although due to the change of regulations following the 1955 disaster this latter event was a non championship race. The DBR1 now took over as Astons main sports racer, but there was one last swan song for the DB3S in the hands of the Whitehead brothers at Le Mans in 1958 with a second place after all the works DBR1s failed to finish. The car won the 2013 Gran Turismo Trophy at Pebble Beach Concours d'Elegance.

Chassis numbers
The 11 works cars had chassis numbers from DB3S/1 to DB3S/11, with the 11th works car never being raced by Aston Martin. The 20 customer cars had three digit chassis numbers, from DB3S/101 to DB3S/120.
In 1994 a recreation car was assembled from original spare parts at Aston Service Dorset. This car carries the continuation chassis number DB3S/121.

Coupés

Originally two works Aston Martin DB3S fixed head coupés were made. The change was to make them more aerodynamic than the open top bodied cars. However, they were unstable at high speeds and both crashed at the 1954 24 Hours of Le Mans. Both coupés were then rebuilt as open bodied cars. Three of the customer cars were also fitted with similar coupé bodies.

Chassis information
Included are a list of victories by each chassis under Aston Martin.

DB3S/1
1953 Charterhall
1953 British Empire Trophy
1953 Charterhall(2)
1953 Castle Coombe
1954 Silverstone
DB3S/2
1953 B.A.R.C. Goodwood
DB3S/3
1954 Silverstone
DB3S/4
1953 B.R.D.C. Silverstone
1953 Ulster TT Dundrod
DB3S/5 - Converted from David Brown's road car
1954 B.O.C. Prescott
1955 B.A.R.C. Crystal Palace
1956 B.A.R.C. Goodwood
1956 B.A.R.C. Aintree
1956 B.A.R.C. Aintree(2)
DB3S/6 - Originally a coupé, rebodied as an open top car.
1955 B.R.D.C. Silverstone
DB3S/7 - Originally a coupé, rebodied as an open top car.
1955 B.A.R.C. Aintree
1955 Silverstone

1955 B.A.R.C. Goodwood
1956 B.A.R.C. Goodwood
DB3S/8
1955 Spa Production Sports Car race
1955 Oulton Park
DB3S/9 - Featured an aerodynamic headrest
1956 Daily Herald International Trophy - Oulton Park
DB3S/10 - Featured an aerodynamic headrest
None
DB3S/11 - Not raced under Aston Martin
None

References

External links
 
 
 
 

DB3S
24 Hours of Le Mans race cars